This is the electoral history of Cal Cunningham. He was a member of the North Carolina Senate from the 23rd district from 2001 to 2003. Cunningham sought the Democratic nomination in the 2010 United States Senate election in North Carolina and was also the Democratic nominee in the 2020 United States Senate election in North Carolina against Republican incumbent Thom Tillis.

North Carolina Senate election

2000

United States Senate elections

2010

Since no candidate received 40% of the vote in the primary, state law allowed a runoff election if requested by the second-place finisher. Cunningham requested such a runoff.

2020

References 

Cunningham, Cal